Nenad Medvidović is a Professor of Computer Science and Informatics at the University of Southern California in Los Angeles, CA. He is a fellow of the IEEE and an ACM Distinguished Member. He was chair of ACM SIGSOFT and co-author of Software Architecture: Foundations, Theory, and Practice (2009). In 2008, he received the Most Influential Paper Award for a paper titled "Architecture-Based Runtime Software Evolution" published in the ACM/IEEE International Conference on Software Engineering 1998.  In 2020, he received the Most Influential Paper Award for a paper titled "An architectural style for solving computationally intensive problems on large networks" published in the ACM/IEEE Software Engineering for Adaptive and Self-Managing Systems 2007. In 2017, he received an IEEE International Conference on Software Architecture Best Paper Award for his paper titled "Continuous Analysis of Collaborative Design".

He received a PhD from UC Irvine in 1999.

Bibliography
 Software Architecture: Foundations, Theory, and Practice 2009. Wiley,

References

External links
Website

Living people
Computer scientists
University of Southern California faculty
American computer programmers
Computer science writers
Year of birth missing (living people)